The 2003–04 Slovenian PrvaLiga season started on 20 July 2003 and ended on 30 May 2004. Each team played a total of 32 matches.

First stage

Table

Results

Second stage

Championship group

Table

Results

Relegation group

Table

Results

Relegation play-offs

Drava Ptuj won on away goals rule.

Top goalscorers 

Source: PrvaLiga.si

See also
2003–04 Slovenian Football Cup
2003–04 Slovenian Second League

References
General

Specific

External links
Official website of the PrvaLiga 

Slovenian PrvaLiga seasons
Slovenia
1